The Rank Prizes comprise the Rank Prize for Optoelectronics and the Rank Prize for Nutrition. The prizes recognise, reward and encourage researchers working in the respective fields of optoelectronics and nutrition.

The prizes are funded by the charity The Rank Prize Funds, which were endowed by the industrialist, philanthropist and founder of the Rank Organisation, J. Arthur Rank and his wife Nell, via the Rank Foundation on 16 February 1972, not long before Arthur's death. The two Funds, the Human and Animal Nutrition and Crop Husbandry Fund and the Optoelectronics Fund, support sciences which reflect Rank's business interests through his "connection with the flour-milling and cinema and electronics industries", and which Rank believed would be of great benefit to humanity. The Rank Prize Funds also recognise, support and foster excellence among young and emerging researchers in the two fields of nutrition and optoelectronics. The Funds aim to advance and promote education and learning for public benefit.

Rank Prize for Optoelectronics
The Rank Prize for Optoelectronics supports, encourages, and rewards researchers working at the cutting edge of optoelectronics research, initially (from 1976) awarded annually, now a biennial prize  worth £100,000. Optoelectronics relates to the interface between optics and electronics, and related phenomena.

The Committee on Optoelectronics consists of the following people:
Donal Bradley CBE FRS (Chairman)
Roberto Cipolla FREng
Martin D. Dawson FRSE
Helen Gleeson OBE
Anya Hurlbert
Simon Laughlin FRS, neurobiologist
John Mollon DSc FRS
Miles Padgett FRSE FRS
Wilson Sibbett CBE FRS FRSE
Maurice Skolnick FRS

Past winners include:
1978 – Charles K. Kao
1982 – C. Thomas Elliott
1982 – Calvin Quate
1988 – T. Peter Brody
1991 – David N. Payne and William Alexander Gambling
1993 – Arthur Ashkin
1995 – William Bradshaw Amos
1998 – Federico Capasso
1998 – Isamu Akasaki, Hiroshi Amano and Shuji Nakamura
2006 - Charles H. Bennett, Gilles Brassard and Stephen Wiesner
2006 - Paul Alivisatos
2008 – Mandyam Srinivasan
2008 – Peter B. Denyer
2014 – Alf Adams
2014 − Eli Yablonovitch
2018 – Jonathan C. Knight
2018 – Philip Russell
2018 – Tim Birks
2022 − Michael Graetzel

Rank Prize for Nutrition
The Rank Prize for Nutrition is for research in human and animal nutrition (distinct from animal husbandry), and crop husbandry.

The Committee on Nutrition consists of the following people:

 John Mathers PhD Hon FAfN (Chairman)
 Malcolm Bennett
 Michael Gooding
 Peter Gregory FRASE
 Sarah Gurr
 Anne-Marie Minihane
 Susan Ozanne
 Ann Prentice OBE PHD
 John Wilding

The Rank Prize for Nutrition was awarded at various intervals since 1976, but is now also awarded biennially, worth £100,000.

In 2014 Australian biophysicist Graham Farquhar and the CSIRO agronomist Richard Richards were awarded the Rank Prize in Nutrition, for "pioneering the understanding of isotope discrimination in plants and its application to breed wheat varieties that use water more efficiently", which related to a discovery the pair made in the 1980s.

Other winners include:
1981 −  Hugo Kortschak, Marshall (Hal) Davidson Hatch and Roger Slack, for "outstanding work on the mechanism of photosynthesis which established the existence of an alternative pathway for the initial fixation of carbon dioxide in some important food plants".
1982 − Hamish Munro, for his work on the protein metabolism of mammals.
1984 − Elsie Widdowson, for her work on the values of foods as nutrient sources, the effects of long-term undernutrition and starvation and the nature and control of the growth process. 
1989 − Vernon R. Young, for his work on the amino acid metabolism of man.
1992 −  Kenneth Blaxter, lifetime award given posthumously.
1995 – Richard Smithells and B.M. Hibbard, for "pioneering studies into the role of micronutrient deficiencies, principally folic acid deficiency, and neural tube defects".

2006 − Charles H. Bennett (physicist), Gilles Brassard and Stephen Wiesner for research on the original concept of quantum cryptography.
2010 − Peter E. Hartmann and Robyn Owens for their "research on human lactation, including methods for the non-invasive measurement of the rate of milk secretion".
2020 – Stephen O'Rahilly
2022 – Cathie Martin

References

Awards established in the 1970s
Optoelectronics
Nutrition